Wieprzec  is a village in the administrative district of Gmina Maków Podhalański, within Sucha County, Lesser Poland Voivodeship, in southern Poland.

The village has a population of 428.

References

Wieprzec